Strictly FX is a live special effects company. The company has won the Parnelli award for Pyro Company of the Year.

About

In 1996, Strictly FX was founded by industry veterans Ted Maccabee and Mark Grega. Strictly FX is a live special effects company that focuses on concert tours, sporting and corporate events. The company's work consist of aiding in the performance of the show, including; lasers, pyrotechnics, flames, cryogenics, confetti, streamers, drones, as well as design. 

Strictly FX provides their services to over 500 shows every year, including working with Roger Waters, Luke Bryan, WWE and the Super Bowl. Strictly FX has won multiple awards, including; the Parnelli Pyro Company of the Year in 2007, 2009, 2010, 2011, 2012, 2014, 2015, 2016, 2017, 2018 and 2020. They've also been awarded the Tour Link Top Dog Award for best Pyro/special effects company in 2012 and 2014.

The firm also was in charge of the fireworks for the Celebrating America television special, which was part of the festivities for the Inauguration of Joe Biden.

In 2021, Strictly FX acquired the UK based company Quantum Special Effects and opened their first overseas branch, Strictly FX UK Ltd.

References

http://www.strictlyfx.com/
https://parnelliawards.com/
https://www.tourlinkpro.com/

External links

Special effects companies